Strategic Insights was a monthly electronic journal produced by the Center for Contemporary Conflict at the Naval Postgraduate School in Monterey, California.

History
The first volume was Volume I, Issue 1 (March 2002). Strategic Insights folded in 2011. A complete archive of the journal is available on the World Wide Web at the website of the Center for Contemporary Conflict.

References

2002 establishments in California
2011 disestablishments in California
Monthly magazines published in the United States
Online magazines published in the United States
Defunct magazines published in the United States
Magazines established in 2002
Magazines disestablished in 2011
Magazines published in California
Mass media in Monterey County, California
Military magazines published in the United States